Vomeronasal type-1 receptor 2 is a protein that in humans is encoded by the VN1R2 gene.

References

Further reading

G protein-coupled receptors